A total lunar eclipse will take place on November 18, 2040. The southern limb of the moon will pass through the center of the Earth's shadow.

This eclipse is a part of Saros cycle 136, and the second of the series that passes through the center of the Earth's shadow. The first central eclipse of this series will take place on November 8, 2022.

Visibility
It will be completely visible over Central Asia, Africa, and Europe, seen as rising over Western Africa, and South America, and setting over Australia.

Related lunar eclipses

Lunar year series (354 days)

Saros series
This eclipse is a part of Saros cycle 136, and the second of the series that passes through the center of the Earth's shadow. The first central eclipse of this series will take place on 8 November 2022. The next occurrence will happen on 30 November 2058.

Metonic series
 First eclipse: November 20, 2002.
 Second eclipse: November 19, 2021.
 Third eclipse: November 18, 2040.
 Fourth eclipse: November 19, 2059.
 Fifth eclipse: November 19, 2078.

Tzolkinex 
 Preceded: Lunar eclipse of October 8, 2033
 Followed: Lunar eclipse of January 1, 2048

See also
List of lunar eclipses and List of 21st-century lunar eclipses

External links
Saros series 136

2040-11
2040-11
2040-11
2040 in science